Cardioglossa venusta is a species of frog in the family Arthroleptidae. It is endemic to the mountains of western Cameroon. Specifically, it is known from Mount Manengouba, the Bamileke Highlands, Mount Nlonako, and the Rumpi Hills. Common name highland long-fingered frog has been coined for it.

Description
Males measure  in snout–vent length. Males have extremely long third fingers and spines in the fingers and in the groin; females lack these characteristics. Dorsal markings and the white line running under the tympanum, typical for the genus Cardioglossa, are absent.

Habitat and conservation
It can also persist in degraded, secondary habitat near more mature forest. Breeding takes place in streams.

Cardioglossa venusta is a poorly known species with highly fragmented population. It is threatened by further habitat loss caused by agricultural encroachment, expanding human settlements, and harvesting of wood for both firewood and building materials. It might occur in the Rumpi Hills Wildlife Reserve, but this would offer only limited protection.

References

venusta
Frogs of Africa
Amphibians of Cameroon
Endemic fauna of Cameroon
Amphibians described in 1972
Taxonomy articles created by Polbot
Fauna of the Cameroonian Highlands forests